Mordellistena anaspoides is a species of beetle in the family Mordellidae. It is in the genus Mordellistena. It was discovered in 1967.

References

anaspoides
Beetles described in 1967